Ulmus laevis var. simplicidens is a variety of the European white elm which exists at the National Botanic Garden of Latvia in Salaspils; it was obtained from St. Petersburg, Russia, in 1964.

Description
The tree was described by Egbert Wolf in 1924. The varietal epithet simplicidens translates as 'simple teeth'.

Accessions

Europe
National Botanic Garden of Latvia, Salaspils, Latvia. Acc. no. 18137

References

Elm species and varieties
Ulmus articles missing images
laevis var. simplicidens